Chelsea Rae Thomas (born January 26, 1990) is an American, former collegiate All-American, professional right-handed softball pitcher, originally from Pleasantville, Iowa. Thomas pitched for the Missouri Tigers in the Big 12 Conference and Southeastern Conference; Thomas is the career leader in wins and strikeouts for the school. She ranks top-10 for no hitters (11) and perfect games (3) in the NCAA Division I. Born in Des Moines, Iowa, she attended Pleasantville High School. She played on Team USA softball. Thomas and was drafted #20 in the National Pro Fastpitch and won a title in 2014. She is currently an Assistant Coach to the McKendree University softball team.

Missouri
Thomas debuted on February 14, defeating the Virginia Tech Hokies in a shutout, allowing a hit and fanning three batters. She would no hit the Southeast Missouri Redhawks on March 7. For her sophomore year, Thomas set a career best with 14 strikeouts in regulation, winning against the Illinois State Redbirds on March 14 before having to redshirt the year because of injury. In 2011, Thomas was named Big-12 Pitcher of The Year and led the Nation in ERA. On March 2, she pitched a perfect game against the Drake Bulldogs with 11 strikeouts. Thomas would go on to defeat the Oklahoma Sooners on April 16 and totaled 17 strikeouts and combined with Keilani Ricketts for 33 total for a top NCAA single game record. She would lead the Tigers into the 2011 Women's College World Series and help set the combined strikeout record (30) at the World Series by throwing a career best 19 strikeouts in a 13-inning loss to the Baylor Bears on June 4. Thomas earned a second Pitcher of The Year citation and tossed 46.0 consecutive scoreless innings for a career highlight in 2012. For her final year, Thomas crossed 1,000 strikeouts for her career vs. the Mississippi Rebels on March 15 with four in two innings of work. She claimed her 100th career victory run-rule defeating the Missouri State Bears on April 3. Thomas made her final appearance losing to the Washington Huskies on May 24, fanning four in a 1-0 two-hitter. Thomas was named 2013 SEC Pitcher of the Year.

Personal
As a member of the United States women's national softball team she won 2011 World Cup of Softball. In 2013,  She played professional softball for the USSSA Pride in the  National Pro Fastpitch league.

Thomas completed her B.S. in biology in fall 2012 and M.Ed. in counseling in fall 2013 at Missouri.

Statistics

Missouri Tigers

References

External links
 
 
 USA Softball

1990 births
People from Marion County, Iowa
Living people
American softball players
Softball players from Iowa
Missouri Tigers softball players
Softball players at the 2011 Pan American Games
Sportspeople from Des Moines, Iowa
Pan American Games gold medalists for the United States
Pan American Games medalists in softball
USSSA Pride players
Medalists at the 2011 Pan American Games